The 1927–28 Divisione Nazionale season was won by Torino.

AS Roma and SC Napoli joined the championship as special guests by order of the fascist authorities to allow a wider representation of Southern Italy.

Clubs
Novara, Pro Patria, Reggiana and Lazio joined from the lower First Division. Some clubs in Rome and Genoa were merged.

First phase

Group A

Classification

Results table

Group B

Classification

Results table

Final round

Classification

Results table

Top goalscorers

References and sources
Almanacco Illustrato del Calcio - La Storia 1898-2004, Panini Edizioni, Modena, September 2005

Footnotes

Serie A seasons
Italy
1927–28 in Italian football leagues